Ahmed Nawaz Baloch is a Pakistani politician who is member-elect of the Provincial Assembly of the Balochistan.

Political career

He was elected to the Provincial Assembly of Balochistan as a candidate of Balochistan National Party (Mengal) (BNP-M) from Constituency PB-30 (Quetta XII) in 2018 Pakistani general election. He received 10,102 votes and defeated Mir Atta Muhammad Bangulzai, a candidate of National Party. Following his successful election, BNP-M nominated him for the office of Deputy Speaker of the Provincial Assembly of the Balochistan. On 16 August 2018, he received 21 votes and lost the seat to Sardar Babar Khan Musakhel who secured 36 votes.

References

Living people
Politicians from Balochistan, Pakistan
Balochistan National Party (Mengal) MPAs (Balochistan)
Year of birth missing (living people)